The 1886 Wimbledon Championships took place on the outdoor grass courts at the All England Lawn Tennis Club in Wimbledon, London, United Kingdom. The tournament ran from 3 July until 17 July. It was the 10th staging of the Wimbledon Championships, and the first Grand Slam tennis event of 1886. Henry Jones retired as referee after nine years, and was replaced by Julian Marshall.

Champions

Men's singles

 William Renshaw defeated  Herbert Lawford, 6–0, 5–7, 6–3, 6–4

Women's singles

 Blanche Bingley defeated  Maud Watson, 6–3, 6–3

Men's doubles

 Ernest Renshaw /  William Renshaw defeated  Claude Farrer /  Arthur Stanley, 6–3, 6–3, 4–6, 7–5

References

External links
 Official Wimbledon Championships website

 
Wimbledon Championships
Wimbledon Championships
Wimbledon Championships
July 1886 sports events